Caton railway station served the village of Caton in the City of Lancaster district of Lancashire, England. 

The station was located near Ball Lane and Station Road, with the latter crossing the railway on the level immediately to the east. It opened with the line in November 1849, being built by the "Little" North Western Railway.  The route was initially constructed as single track, with a passing loop here - the Lancaster to Hornby stretch eventually being doubled by the Midland Railway in 1889.   

The station was closed in May 1961 by the British Railways Board as an economy measure, though the line remained in use until closure to passengers in 1966 between Wennington and Morecambe. 

Freight services finished the following year in 1967 and the track was subsequently dismantled. The line has since been converted into a footpath and cycleway westwards towards Lancaster, including the two old railway viaducts across the River Lune at Crook o' Lune. 

The station house survives as a private residence, whilst the old goods shed is now a church. The old formation eastwards is still visible from nearby roads and can be traced via satellite photos.

References

Disused railway stations in Lancaster
Former Midland Railway stations
Railway stations in Great Britain opened in 1849